The 2015–16 A-1 League was the 25th season of the A-1 League, the highest professional basketball league in Croatia.

The first half of the season consists of 11 teams and 110-game regular season. For second half of the season clubs will be divided into two groups. Championship group will consist of 3 teams from ABA League and the best 5 teams from first half of the season. Relegation group will consist of bottom 6 teams from first half of the season.

Teams and venues
Promoted from A-2 Liga
Škrljevo (Champion)

Regular season

Results

Source: Scoresway.com

Championship round

Relegation and promotion rounds

Relegation round

Teams "carried" the results of the matches played between them from the regular season.

Promotion round

Relegation/Promotion play-off
Relegation league 5th-placed team Škrljevo faces the 2nd-placed Promotion league side Jazine in a two-legged play-off. The winner on aggregate score after both matches will earn a spot in the 2016–17 A-1 League.

Škrljevo vs. Jazine

Škrljevo retained its A-1 League status

Playoffs

Bracket

Semifinals
The semifinals are best-of-3 series.

Cedevita vs. Kvarner

Cibona vs. Zadar

Finals
The semifinals are best-of-5 series.

Cedevita vs. Cibona

Stats leaders

MVP of the Round

Championship round

Play off

External links
Official Site
Scoresway Page
Eurobasket.com League Page

A-1 Liga seasons
Croatian
A1